KIFS (107.5 FM) is a radio station broadcasting a Top 40 (CHR) format. Licensed to Ashland, Oregon, United States, the station serves the Medford-Ashland area.  The station is currently owned by Bicoastal Media Licenses Vi, LLC. The station is branded "107.5 Kiss-FM."  Longtime market talent Gemineye returned to KISS-FM after an eight-month leave in August 2013 and resumed his role as morning man and program director.  He is followed at 10:00AM by Mike Raines, and Kristina With A "K" at 2:00PM.

History
107.5 KKJJ came on the air in 1996 with a Hot Adult Contemporary format.  When the station was acquired by Clear Channel, it became Top 40, KIFS in 2000, as “Kiss 107 FM” with Rick Dees in the Morning.

Translators
KIFS broadcasts on the following translator:

References

External links
Official website

Ashland, Oregon
Contemporary hit radio stations in the United States
IFS
1996 establishments in Oregon